Pine Springs is an unincorporated community in northern Culberson County, Texas, United States. It is the closest settlement to the headquarters of Guadalupe Mountains National Park, which contains Guadalupe Peak, the highest point in the state of Texas. Pine Springs is located on U.S. Routes 62 and 180. The last population read 51 residents.

Climate

Overview
Pine Springs experiences a semi-arid climate with hot summers and cool winters. Pine Springs is located at the base of the Guadalupe Mountains, at a higher elevation than most of the Chihuahuan Desert. As a result, Pine Springs is substantially cooler and receives more precipitation than the vast majority of the desert. Due to Pine Springs' elevation and aridity, temperatures drop sharply after sunset. Most precipitation falls in the summer and early fall, as thunderstorms sweep across the desert. Bitterly cold temperatures close to zero are rare, but can occur in winter months.

Spring
Temperatures and the likelihood of precipitation both tend to increase as Spring progresses. Rapid and substantial swings in temperature, associated with wind shifts and the passage of weather fronts, are common through the Spring, with hot daytime temperatures possible as early as the month of March, and freezing cold nighttime temperatures possible as late as the month of May.

Summer
In late May or early June, the weather stabilizes for the summer, and remains so until the passage of the first cold front, usually in September. Most precipitation occurs in the summer months, in the form of fast moving and short lived thunderstorms. Days are dry and hot, although temperatures are not as extreme as in the lower areas of the Chihuahuan Desert. Summer nights are comfortably cool, and cool breezes often gently blow across the desert after dark.

Fall
Fall begins with the passage of the first cold front from the north, often in late September or early October. After the last of the summer thunderstorms, usually in August or September, fall is dry. As the season progresses, the weather alternates between warm periods where the wind is predominantly from the south, and cold periods of increasing severity as cold fronts move down from the north. The first frost may be as early as late September, or as late as early December.

Winter 
Winter consists of alternating periods of warm and cold weather. Winter days are usually mild, sometimes even warm, but nighttime temperatures often fall below freezing. Due to Pine Springs' low latitude, prolonged, severe cold is rare. While the day and night after the passage of a strong cold front from the north might see bitterly cold weather, temperatures rapidly warm afterwards. Light snowfall after the passage of a strong cold front is occasional during winter months, but snow usually melts quickly. Heavy snowfall is extremely rare in Pine Springs.

References

Unincorporated communities in Culberson County, Texas
Unincorporated communities in Texas